Manoel Lourenço da Silva (born 1904, date of death unknown) was an Olympic freestyle swimmer from Brazil, who participated at one Summer Olympics for his native country.
 At the 1932 Summer Olympics in Los Angeles, he swam the 4×200-metre freestyle, finishing 7th in the final, along with Isaac Moraes, Manoel Villar and Benevenuto Nunes.

References

1904 births
Year of death missing
Brazilian male freestyle swimmers
Olympic swimmers of Brazil
Swimmers at the 1932 Summer Olympics
20th-century Brazilian people